Nyctimystes bivocalis is a species of frog in the subfamily Pelodryadinae, endemic to New Guinea. It has been observed in the Cloudy Mountains and part of the Owen Stanley Mountains in Milne Bay Province.
The adult male frog measures 38.5 to 49.2 mm long in snout-vent length and it is gray-brown in color. The adult female measures 42.2 to 55.7 mm long and is orange-brown in color.

The name bivocalis or double-voice comes from the two levels of pitch in the frog's call.

References

bivocalis
Amphibians described in 2012
Frogs of Asia